Alaska has the seventh-highest per capita income in the United States, at $30,651 (2014).  Its personal per capita income is $33,568 (2003), the twelfth-highest in the country. Its median household income is $69,825 (2014), ranked second in the country, and its median family income is $82,870 (2014), the fifth-highest in the country.  The median value of an owner-occupied housing unit is $144,201 (2000), ranked twelfth in the country.

Alaska boroughs and census areas ranked by per capita income 

Note: Data is from the 2010 United States Census Data and the 2006–2010 American Community Survey 5-Year Estimates.

References

Demographics of Alaska
Economy of Alaska
Income
Alaska